John Donaldson, Jr., (16 March 1886 – 1 September 1933), better known as Jack, was a professional sprinter in the early part of the 1900s. He held various world sprinting records ranging from 100 yards to 400 yards, some of which stood for many years.

Early life
Jack Donaldson was born in Raywood in central Victoria on 16 March 1886. His father, Jack snr, led a somewhat nomadic life consisting of mining in Tarnagulla, farming in Raywood, and publican in Kerang, before finally moving to Inglewood as proprietor of the Pelican Hotel, when Jack jnr was still quite young.

Growing up in Inglewood, Donaldson, along with his brothers Don, Frank and Dick were prominent athletes and footballers. Lacking any professional training, Donaldson was easily able to beat all comers by the turn of the century.

Professional career
In 1906, aged 20, Donaldson started as favourite in the Stawell Gift with a handicap of 11 yards, but was narrowly beaten by E W Thompson.

Donaldson was one of the rare professional athletes in the world at that time. With his stride of 8 ft 4 in and from his humble beginnings in Inglewood, he skyrocketed to world fame with six world records in distances from 100 yards to 400 yards. He travelled to London, New York and South Africa to compete in exhibition races. He was nicknamed the 'Blue Streak' due to his blue running singlet with a large white 'A'.

At Johannesburg, South Africa, on 12 February 1910, he established a world record of 9 3/8 seconds for the 100 yard dash. It was 38 years before American Mal Patton reduced that time.

Between his overseas tours Jack often returned to Inglewood to be with his family, and at Bendigo in 1911, he competed in a series of footraces against Arthur Postle of Queensland. Postle won the 75 yard dash, but Donaldson won the 130 yard, 220 yard and 440 yard races.

He created yet another world record in beating an American opponent (Charles Holway) at the Sydney Sports Ground on 23 September 1911, a record that stood until 1951. The covering of 130 yards in 12 seconds is generally regarded as Donaldson's most notable performance.

Post-professional career
After retiring from sprinting, Donaldson operated a gymnasium in Inglewood. There are stories about his training methods on the local football ground where, before crowds of cheering locals, he would race after the town's fastest greyhounds, catching them and returning them to their owners.

In 1919, Donaldson moved to New York where he operated a gymnasium. He committed suicide in New York City on 1 September 1933.

World records
Holding six world records during his career, Donaldson's most enduring marks were:

100 yards in 9.375 seconds (set at Johannesburg, 1910), which stood until 1948.

130 yards in 12 seconds (set at Sydney, 1911), which stood until 1951.

References
'Back to Inglewood 2004', Howard Rochester

External links 
 Donaldson, John (Jack) (1886–1933) (Australian Dictionary of Biography)

Australian male sprinters
People from Victoria (Australia)
1886 births
1933 suicides
Suicides in New York City
Sport Australia Hall of Fame inductees